Singapore participated in the 1958 Asian Games held in Tokyo, Japan from May 24 to June 1, 1958. The country ranked 11th with a gold, silver, and bronze medal.

Medalists

Medal summary

Medal table

Weightlifting

Men's

References

Nations at the 1958 Asian Games
1958